Phryganomima is a genus of moths of the family Crambidae. It contains only one species, Phryganomima noctifer, which is found in Colombia.

References

Natural History Museum Lepidoptera genus database

Midilinae
Crambidae genera
Monotypic moth genera
Taxa named by George Hampson